Boverton is a village located to the east of Llantwit Major in the Vale of Glamorgan in South Wales.

History

Boverton was founded during the reign of William the Conqueror in England. It is thought that he himself founded Boverton as a farming community beneath his mighty castle. However, Robert Fitzhamon is credited with founding the castle here, Boverton Place, during the 12th century. The castle was rebuilt around 1587 by Roger Seys, a land owner and attorney general of Wales. Boverton Place was an "impressive" fortified manor house of considerable size.

The Seys family, prominent in Glamorgan throughout the 17th century, moved out in the late 17th century and it fell into decay in the following century.  Local legend states the castle is haunted by the Black Lady who was spotted by men working on the castle in the early 19th Century. She was described as a tall, shadowy figure dressed in mourning clothes.

Landmarks
In present-day Boverton there is a brook, several housing estates, a fish and chip shop, post office, hair salon, gentlemen's barbers, veterinary surgery and The Boverton Castle pub.

Gallery

References

External links 
Boverton Castle pub website

Villages in the Vale of Glamorgan
Llantwit Major